The action of 15 August 1917 was a naval engagement which occurred during the First World War. The action was fought between a German U-boat (believed to be ) and two naval trawlers, Nelson and Ethel & Millie, in the North Sea.

Background
As part of the Imperial German Navy's U-boat campaign of unrestricted submarine warfare German U-boats had started to attack British trawlers (which had previously been protected by the 1907 Naval Convention) in the North Sea. In response to this, fishermen had requested weapons for self-defence, and a number of trawlers been equipped with deck guns, and had gunners assigned to man them. These vessels were generally skippered by men who were members of the Royal Navy Reserve, but were left to continue fishing, and act on their own initiative if attacked, rather than coming under Royal Navy command.

Action

On 15 August 1917, a number of Lowestoft trawlers were fishing in the North Sea, off the Jim Howe bank. Nelson—skippered by Thomas Crisp—was armed with a 3-pounder gun; Ethel & Millie—skippered by William “Johnsey” Manning—carried a 6-pounder.

Crisp cast off his nets—leaving them buoyed on the surface—and turned Nelson toward the U-boat to close the range. Nelson was hit several times; she returned fire, but the shots fell short of their target. Crisp was also hit, and mortally wounded by one of the U-boat's shells, and Nelson began to take on water and sink. At this point, Crisp ordered the crew to abandon ship, which they did, taking to a lifeboat. During this exchange, Ethel & Millie had closed up from the south-east, and, passing Nelson and her lifeboat, moved in to engage the U-boat. Manning proposed to stop and take on the survivors, but they refused, as he was not yet in range of the U-boat. Ethel & Millie continued to close, but she too came under fire from the U-boat, and after several hits, she too was left sinking, her crew also abandoning ship. Nelsons crew observed the men being taken from their boat, and lined up on the U-boat's deck, but were unable to see more as the view became obscured by the haze. Nelsons boat pulled away to the southwest, and escaped into the approaching dusk.

Aftermath
Nelsons crew were at sea for the next two days, being eventually rescued by HMS Dryad, a minesweeper assigned to fishery protection. Crisp's actions were reported and he was awarded the Victoria Cross for the "seamanlike and brave manner" in which he had conducted himself. Ethel & Millies crew were not seen again; they were not reported as prisoners of war and none returned to Britain at the end of hostilities. The suspicion at the time, and subsequently, is that they were disposed of by the U-boat crew, for example by being left to drown while the U-boat submerged. The U-boat which attacked the two boats has been identified as  commanded by Karsten von Heydebreck.

Notes

References
 

Naval battles of World War I involving Germany
Naval battles of World War I involving the United Kingdom
North Sea operations of World War I
Conflicts in 1917
August 1917 events